Moguluru is a village in NTR district of the Indian state of Andhra Pradesh. It is located in Kanchikacherla mandal of Vijayawada revenue division.

References

Villages in NTR district